× Brassoepidendrum, abbreviated Bepi. in the horticultural trade, is the nothogenus of intergeneric orchid hybrids including wild ancestors from both genera Brassavola and Epidendrum, and from no others.

References

External links
 
 

Orchid nothogenera
Laeliinae